Vlug en Lenig is a Dutch handball club in Geleen. The club was founded on 1 September 1949.

The men's team of V&L won the Dutch National Championship in 1982, 1983, 1984, 1986 and 2002. The club has participated in European club team tournaments several times. It has also won the national cup three times, in 1983, 1985 and 1994.

In 2008, V&L co-operated with HV Sittardia and HV BFC to form a stronger men's team. The project was called Tophandbal Zuid-Limburg and two team were formed: Limburg Lions and Limburg Wild Dogs (later turned into the second team of Limburg Lions). In 2016, the management of BFC decided to take no longer part in the collabation.

Also the woman's team of V&L has been successful, they won the Dutch National Championship in 1987 and 1990. In 2010, the woman's team promoted back to the eredivisie after one year of absence, where they have been a stable factor since.

Accomplishments

Men
NHV Eredivisie: 
Winners (6) : 1982, 1983, 1984, 1985, 1986, 2002
Runner-Up (7) : 1968, 1970, 1985, 1989, 1991, 1996, 1998
Dutch Handball Cup: 
Winners (3) : 1983, 1985, 1994
Runner-Up (8) : 1980, 1981, 1988, 1989, 1990, 1995, 1998, 2003
Dutch Supercup: 
Runner-Up (2) : 1994, 2002

Woman
NHV Eredivisie: 
Winners (2) : 1987, 1990
Runner-Up (3) : 2004, 2005, 2007
Dutch Handball Cup: 
Runner-Up (7) : 1986, 1988, 1991, 1992, 1993, 2004, 2008
Dutch Supercup: 
Runner-Up (2) : 1992, 1993

References

External links 
Vlug en Lenig Official Website

Dutch handball clubs
Sports clubs in Sittard-Geleen
1949 establishments in the Netherlands
Handball clubs established in 1949